was a Japanese film producer. Widely regarded as the creator of the Godzilla franchise, he produced all 22 installments in the series from 1954 to 1995. He is one of the most prolific Japanese producers of all time, having worked on more than 200 films, including over 80 tokusatsu films.

Early life 
Tanaka was born on April 26, 1910, in Kashiwara, Osaka. As a child, he would often walk miles to the nearest theater to watch silent adventure and ninja films in the afternoons. At the age of 14, Tanaka saw the silent Western film The Covered Wagon and was so enamored by its cinematography that it remained his all-time favorite film. In his youth, Tanaka was once disowned by his parents because he focused more on his interests, films and acting, than on his studies.

Career 

Soon after graduating from Kansai University, Tanaka entered the Japanese film industry in 1940 and joined the film studio Taiho Eiga. The following year, Tanaka moved to Toho after it merged with Taiho Eiga and began his career as a producer under Iwao Mori. After four years with the company, he began producing his own films, and his first effort, Three Women of the North, was released in 1945. In his 57-year career, Tanaka produced more than 200 films.

He is best known as the creator, with storyteller Shigeru Kayama, director Ishirō Honda, writer Takeo Murata and special-effects wizard Eiji Tsuburaya, of Godzilla, the towering embodiment of post-World War II anxiety. Tanaka created Godzilla in 1954 in an effort to illustrate the terror Japanese felt after the atomic bombings of Hiroshima and Nagasaki. In an interview in 1985, Tanaka summed up the symbolism of Godzilla:

In those days, Japanese had a real horror of radiation, and that horror is what made Godzilla so huge. From the beginning he has symbolized nature's revenge on mankind.

The classic 1954 film Godzilla (1954; released in the U.S. in 1956 as Godzilla, King of the Monsters!) would spawn a series of sequels, adding up to 36 films by 2021. Thirty-two movies have been produced by Toho, and four by the American studios TriStar Pictures and Legendary Pictures. He often worked with the other three members of the Godzilla team: Honda, Tsuburaya, and composer Akira Ifukube, to complete such works as The Mysterians (1957) and Matango (1963). Tanaka produced six films directed by the acclaimed Akira Kurosawa. Their film Kagemusha (1980) was nominated for a Best Foreign Film Oscar and took the Palme d'Or at Cannes.

Personal life 
Tanaka was married to actress Chieko Nakakita. They adopted a daughter named Mieko.

Filmography

As producer

References

Bibliography

External links
Tomoyuki Tanaka on the official Toho website (archived)

1910 births
1997 deaths
Japanese film producers
People from Kashiwara, Osaka